Harry Lime may refer to
Harry Lime, a character in the 1949 film The Third Man
The Adventures of Harry Lime, UK radio programme broadcast between 1951 and 1952 based on the character in the above film